Gertrud Maria Elisa Thausing (December 29, 1905 – May 4, 1997) was an Austrian Egyptologist, and the head of the Institute for Egyptology and African Studies at the University of Vienna from 1954 to 1977.

Biography 
Gertrud Maria Elisa Thausing was born on December 29, 1905, in Vienna. She studied Egyptology at the University of Vienna, and collaborated with prominent Egyptologists Hermann Junker and Wilhelm Czermak. She is most well known for her work on African linguistics, including the study of Egyptian, Coptic and Nubian languages. Her work on Egyptian religion and mythology has also been widely cited. From 1953 to 1977 she was the head of the Institute for Egyptology and African Studies at the University of Vienna.

She published her autobiography Tarudet. Ein Leben für die Ägyptologie in 1989. She died on May 4, 1997, at the age of 92.

Selected bibliography 

 Zwischen den beiden Ewigkeiten: Festschrift Gertrud Thausing (1994) 
 Tarudet - Ein Leben für die Ägyptologie (1989) 
 Sein und Werden. Versuch einer Ganzheitsschau der Religion des Pharaonenreiches (1971) 
 Nofretari. Eine Dokumentation der Wandgemälde ihres Grabes (1971) 
 Das große ägyptische Totenbuch (Papyrus Reinisch) der Papyrussammlung der Österreichischen Nationalbibliothek (1969) 
 Der Auferstehungsgedanke in ägyptischen religiösen Texten (1943)

References

External links 
Works by and about Gertrud Thausing in the German National Library

Austrian Egyptologists
1905 births
1997 deaths
University of Vienna alumni
Academic staff of the University of Vienna